Jenna Marie Ortega (born September 27, 2002) is an American actress. She began her career as a child actress, receiving recognition for her role as young Jane in The CW comedy-drama series Jane the Virgin (2014–2019). Her breakthrough role came in portraying Harley Diaz in the Disney Channel series Stuck in the Middle (2016–2018), for which she won an Imagen Award. She played Ellie Alves in the second season of the thriller series You in 2019 and starred in the family film Yes Day (2021), both for Netflix.

Ortega received critical praise for her performance in the teen drama film The Fallout (2021), and went on to star in the slasher films Scream and X (both 2022), and Scream VI (2023). In 2022, she began starring as Wednesday Addams in the Netflix horror comedy series Wednesday, for which she received nominations at the Golden Globe and Screen Actors Guild Awards.

Early life 
Jenna Marie Ortega was born on September 27, 2002, in Coachella Valley, California, the fourth of six children. Her father is of Mexican descent and her mother is of Mexican and Puerto Rican ancestry. Due to her career, Ortega has not "really lived a normal lifestyle"; she has also expressed regret at missing the traditional high school experience and teenage milestones such as prom and graduation.

Career

2012–2017: Early acting roles and Disney 
Ortega had become interested in acting from the age of six. Two years later, after her mother posted a video of Ortega doing a dramatic monologue on Facebook, Ortega got an agent and started getting auditions. She soon made her acting debut in 2012 with a guest appearance for Rob, in the episode "Baby Bug." Following this was an appearance on CSI: NY on the episode "Unspoken" as Aimee Moore. In 2013, she made her film debut with a minor role in the superhero movie Iron Man 3 as the vice president's daughter. Following this, Ortega starred in the horror film Insidious: Chapter 2, the second film in the Insidious franchise, as Annie, a supporting role. Both films were successful at the box-office.

In 2014, Ortega was cast in the role of Zoe Leon on the series Rake, and from 2014 to 2019, played the recurring younger version of Jane on the romantic-drama series Jane the Virgin. Also in 2014, she starred as Mary Ann in the direct-to-video comedy film The Little Rascals Save the Day. In 2015, Ortega was cast for the Netflix original series Richie Rich as part of the main cast, playing Darcy, a gold digger who spends Richie's money even without his consent; the show was panned. In the same year, she appeared in the film After Words as Anna Chapa.

From 2016 to 2018, Ortega then went on to star in the lead of the Disney Channel sitcom Stuck in the Middle as Harley Diaz, the middle child of the seven Diaz siblings who is an aspiring inventor. Ortega's performance garnered her an Imagen Award nomination for Best Young Actor – Television; she later received two more nominations for her work on the same show, including a win in 2018. In the same year, she joined the cast on Disney's Elena of Avalor, as the voice of Princess Isabel, which ended in 2020. In 2017, she starred in the music video for Jacob Sartorius' "Chapstick", which also stars the singer. In the video, Ortega played Sartorius' love interest, which gained significant media coverage.

2018–2020: Transition to mainstream roles 

In 2018, Ortega starred in the film Saving Flora as the lead role of Dawn, the daughter of a circus owner. The film received positive reviews from critics, and Ortega received praise for her performance. She received a nomination for Best Lead Actress at the Southampton International Film Festival. Ortega had been cast in the main role of Ellie Alves on the second season of the Netflix thriller series You, which was released on December 26, 2019. In You, her character is a smart and meddling girl who likes to act older than her true age. Ortega commented on working with co-stars Penn Badgley and Victoria Pedretti, stating that "I wish I had gotten to shoot with Victoria more, because I think she's really talented. ... Penn is such an eloquent speaker, so well-thought and so respectful and so kind, and just such a pleasure to work with." The season, alike to the show's first season, was praised as well as Ortega's performance.

In 2019, Ortega was cast as Pheobe in the Netflix horror film The Babysitter: Killer Queen. She said in an segment with Cosmopolitan that she had been "incredibly nervous" when they began filming, stating that "because it was a sequel, all of the other cast members already knew each other ... I went on the set panicking because I didn't know what I was doing." The film was released in September 2020, and received mixed reviews from critics. In 2020, Ortega voiced Brooklyn in the Netflix animated series Jurassic World Camp Cretaceous. The series was met with mixed reviews, although praise went towards Ortega's voicing and the rest of the cast. The series was renewed for a second season, slated to release in 2021. In 2020, Ortega announced that she would make her writing debut with the book It's All Love, which was released in January 2021. Ortega subsequently starred as Katie Torres in the Netflix comedy movie Yes Day. She was cast in 2019, and the film was released in March 2021 to mixed reviews, though her performance was praised.

2021–present: Breakthrough and Wednesday
In March 2021, the high-school drama film The Fallout was released, in which Ortega portrayed the lead role of Vada; it was released on HBO Max on January 27, 2022. Cast in February 2020, filming took place over a month between August and September of that same year. It received a positive response from critics, and Ortega's acting was lauded, with several critics dubbing it her "breakout" film role. The Hollywood Reporter wrote: "...Ortega's beautifully nuanced turn understands the nothing-to-look-at-here façade and the chinks in the armor." Decider wrote similarly, praising her performance as "raw without going overboard. What could have been cliches along Vada's character path become earnest and real thanks to her commitment to the performance and a thorough understanding of its emotional beats." Variety magazine described Vada as her breakthrough film role, writing that "Ortega in particular seems to have found her voice." CinemaBlend praised the chemistry between her and her co-star Maddie Ziegler, and stated that the "two girls at the center of it all also look phenomenal, as a true bond can be sensed in the process of bringing this story to life." Mashable wrote that she "smoothly shoulders a role, richly written in lovingly messy complexities, and gives it breath as well as staggering sobs."

Ortega was cast as Tara Carpenter in the slasher film Scream in 2020, on which she stated that "I don't even think there are words in the English language to correctly express how happy, excited and nervous I am for this journey." Filming took place in Wilmington, North Carolina from September to November of that same year. On working with co-stars Neve Campbell, Courteney Cox and David Arquette, she stated that "You never know what to expect when you're meeting people of that standard, but they truly were just the most down-to-earth, sweetest people." The film emerged as a critical and commercial success, becoming the 28th-highest grossing film of 2022 and winning her the MTV Movie Award for Most Frightened Performance.

Ortega starred in the Foo Fighters-led horror film Studio 666, released in February 2022, and the horror film X, from filmmaker Ti West, which was released in March. The latter earned critical praise, with Screen Rant writing that "Ortega, alongside her role-swapping co-star Mia Goth, is in rare form here, with the pair's performances as two horrified wannabe pornstars turned survivalists as shocking as they are compelling." Following her roles in the 2021 horror film The Babysitter: Killer Queen and the 2022 horror films Scream, Studio 666, X, and American Carnage she was dubbed a scream queen by several media outlets.

In the Netflix comedy horror series Wednesday (2022), Ortega played the titular role of Wednesday Addams, which she called a "new chapter" in her career. To prepare, she underwent "the most physical transformation I've ever done; I cut my hair, and it's black, and mannerism-wise, speaking cadence-wise, expression-wise". She later called production of season one "the most overwhelming job" she had ever had and spoke about being in a constant state of confusion and stress over the direction of the series and character. She later revealed her discomfort with becoming wellknown for her work on the show, having had a creatively unpleasant experience filming it. However, Ortega's performance in the series was widely praised, receiving nominations for a Golden Globe Award for Best Actress – Television Series Musical or Comedy and for a Screen Actors Guild Award for Outstanding Performance by a Female Actor in a Comedy Series.

Upcoming projects
Ortega will next star in the Paramount+ thriller film Finestkind alongside Tommy Lee Jones, Ben Foster and Toby Wallace She has joined the cast of Lionsgate and Point Grey's Miller's Girl, opposite Martin Freeman. Ortega called her character in Miller's Girl, "the most complex character that I've ever played" and described the material as risky. Ortega is also set to star and executive produce the romantic drama Winter, Spring, Summer, or Fall. As of March 2023, Ortega is starring in and executive producing an untitled Trey Edward Shults film, with The Weeknd and Barry Keoghan costarring.

Ortega is attached to star in Beetlejuice 2 for Warner Bros. Pictures; as well as Alba to be produced and distributed by A24 with Camila Mendes costarring as Ortega's sister. Both projects shoot summer 2023.

Personal life 
Ortega has used her platforms to promote support for immigrants and politics involving them. Ortega is a supporter of Pride Over Prejudice, a campaign that promotes acceptance towards the LGBT community; she has advocated for the organization since she was the age of 13. She is pro-immigration and anti-discrimination, and told Teen Vogue: "It's important to embrace your culture today because there are so many different ethnicities in America. At the end of the day, you are you. You've got to stay true to yourself, and you can't change yourself in order to fit in or to make someone else feel comfortable."

In 2016, Ortega organized a meet and greet for fans to raise money for a young girl with cancer. In 2018, at the Radio Disney Music Awards, Ortega wore a jacket, which displayed the words "I Do Care And U Should Too" in response to first lady Melania Trump's apparel when she went to visit immigrant children who were being housed without their parents, which read "I Really Don't Care. Do U?". The stand gained significant media coverage. On the action, Ortega told Forbes: "I remember I was going through the news on my phone and I saw what Melania wore on the way to visit the immigrant children. I was so deeply offended and right there at that moment I knew what I wanted my statement to be..." Across 2019, Ortega appeared at numerous WE Day concerts across the United States and Canada to benefit WE Charity.

In 2020, Ortega was named a brand ambassador for Neutrogena. On becoming an ambassador, she told ¡Hola!: "I could not be more ecstatic. I say it over and over, but it really is such a surreal feeling, especially with such an iconic brand, that I have looked up to for such a long time." The following year, Ortega announced on her Instagram that she was partnering with Neutrogena on "For People with Skin", which is a "team commitment to advance skin health for all consumers, regardless of race, age, ethnicity, skin need, or income."

In 2022, Ortega revealed she almost stopped acting to become a soccer player. She said she played in all attacking positions and in some cases as a midfielder and she said she is a fan of Argentine player Lionel Messi as well as FC Barcelona. As a girl, she took part in the American Youth Soccer Organization, a youth soccer program.

On an episode of Hot Ones released on March 2, 2023, Ortega criticized the entertainment industry for seemingly misrepresenting Generation Z as not "smart". She further believed that recent media had a trend of portraying Gen Z in their teenage years as  "bratty", "bad mouth teens", or "a lot of times unintelligent, which I don’t think is true".

Acting style and influences 
Ortega has stated that she feels taking more varied roles in acting is important to her, as to not be typecast; she told E! Online in 2021 that she did not want to be "pigeonholed as an actor," and that her desire to "do the most diverse roles that I possibly can and really switch up" made the transition to mature roles easier for her. She has said that horror works are what she feels most comfortable with starring in, telling Rotten Tomatoes in 2022 that she was "pretty comfortable with all the horror stuff".

In an interview with Collider, Ortega said that she was initially inspired to pursue acting after watching the performance of actress Dakota Fanning in the 2004 thriller film Man on Fire, stating that "After watching Dakota, who obviously was so talented from such a young age, I decided that I wanted to be the Puerto Rican version of her." She also said that she thought Denzel Washington was "the coolest man I had ever seen in my life." Ortega also cites actress Gina Rodriguez, whom she worked with on the television drama Jane The Virgin, as one of her major influences. She stated that she admires Rodriguez for her story being similar to hers, and for her efforts and ability.

Public image 
In 2022, she was dubbed the "Next Big Thing" by The Hollywood Reporter. 

Following roles in horror media in 2022, Ortega was crowned a scream queen. Writing on the status, Inverse observed that she expanded the title's definition with her versatile roles, having been both "the red herring and the Final Girl, even within the same movie".

Filmography

Film

Television

Music videos 
 "Chapstick" (2017), by Jacob Sartorius
 "Still Alive" (2023), by Demi Lovato (Ortega appears in archive images of the film Scream VI)

Awards and nominations

Notes

References

External links

 
 

2002 births
21st-century American actresses
Actresses from California
American actresses of Mexican descent
American actresses of Puerto Rican descent
American child activists
American child actresses
American film actresses
American television actresses
American voice actresses
Hispanic and Latino American actresses
American LGBT rights activists
Living people
People from Coachella, California